HMS Tudor was a British submarine of the third group of the T class. She was built as P326 at Devonport Dockyard, and launched on 23 September 1942.  So far she has been the only ship of the Royal Navy to bear the name Tudor, after the Tudor period or Tudor dynasty.

Service

Tudor served in the Far East for much of her career in World War II, where she sank five Japanese sailing vessels, four Japanese coasters, and another Japanese vessel, as well as an unidentified sailing vessel north of Sumatra.

During the war Tudor was adopted by the Borough of Bridgend as part of Warship Week.  The plaque from this adoption is held by the National Museum of the Royal Navy in Portsmouth.

She survived World War II. On 23 April 1949, Tudor arrived at Halifax, Nova Scotia to begin a three-month tour in Canadian waters helping train Canadian surface vessels in anti-submarine warfare. The submarine was sold for scrap on 1 July 1963 and broken up at Faslane.

Notes

References
 
  
 
 
 
 

 

British T-class submarines of the Royal Navy
Ships built in Plymouth, Devon
1942 ships
World War II submarines of the United Kingdom
Cold War submarines of the United Kingdom